The 2001 season of the Liga de Fútbol Profesional Boliviano was the 44th season of top-tier football in Bolivia.

Torneo Apertura

Torneo Clausura

First stage

Group 1

Group 2

Second stage

Group 1

Group 2

Semifinals

Championship play-off

Notes

Title

See also
Bolivia national football team 2001

References
RSSSF Page

Bolivian Primera División seasons
Bolivia
1